Anti-Bolshevik League may refer to:

Anti-Bolshevik League (China)
Sekka Boshidan, a Japanese organization, sometimes translated as "Anti-Bolshevik League" or "Anti-Red League"
Anti-Bolshevik League (Italy)
Anti-Bolshevik League (Germany)